Gastrolobium formosum is a small, trailing shrub, with red flowers, in the pea family (Fabaceae), which grows  up to a metre high, on clays and loam in swamps and along river banks. The inflorescence consists of head of four unstalked flowers which is sheathed by a whorl of large bracts, with the flower petals being obscured by the lower calyx lobes. The standard petal is less than on third the keel petal.  It is native to the south-west of Western Australia.

It was first described as Jansonia formosa by Richard Kippist in 1847,  with a more detailed description by Kippist in 1851. It was transferred to the genus, Gastrolobium in 2002 by Chandler, Crisp, Cayzer, and Bayer.

The specific epithet, formosum, is a Latin adjective, formosus -a, -um, which describes the plant as "well-formed", "handsome", or "beautiful".

References

formosum
Rosids of Western Australia
Endemic flora of Australia
Plants described in 1847
Taxa named by Richard Kippist
Taxa named by John Lindley